Marne-Nordsee is an Amt ("collective municipality") in the district of Dithmarschen, in Schleswig-Holstein, Germany. Its seat is in Marne. It was formed on 1 January 2008 from the former Amt Kirchspielslandgemeinde Marne-Land, the town Marne and the municipality Friedrichskoog.

The Amt Marne-Nordsee consists of the following municipalities (with population in 2005):

 Diekhusen-Fahrstedt (734)
 Friedrichskoog (2.522)
 Helse (964)
 Kaiser-Wilhelm-Koog (364)
 Kronprinzenkoog (965)
 Marne (6.018)
 Marnerdeich (341)
 Neufeld (646)
 Neufelderkoog (144)
 Ramhusen (163)
 Schmedeswurth (215)
 Trennewurth (269)
 Volsemenhusen (368)

References

Ämter in Schleswig-Holstein